Fighting the Flames is a 1925 American silent drama film directed by B. Reeves Eason. It is not known whether the film currently survives.

Plot
As described in a film magazine and newspaper reviews, Horatio Manly, the dissolute son of Judge Manly, is rescued drunk from a burning hotel and is arrested. His father disowns him and forbids him from coming home until he can make a man of himself. Horatio  makes friends with Mickey, the small son of a pick-pocket named Blacky. The child prevails on Manly to quit drinking alcoholic liquor and become a fireman. Horatio also becomes friendly with Alice Doran, a dressmaker who lives in the upper part of the house where he and Mickey live. Blacky has been doing time, and, when he is released, he tries to make Mickey become a crook. In a struggle with the boy and Alice, Blacky starts a fire in the building that is home for the other three. Manly’s company answers the alarm and Manly rescues Alice and the boy. Blacky is killed and young Manly and his father are reconciled as a result of his heroism.

Cast

Production
During the filming of the scene where William Welsh goes into a burning building to rescue its occupants, a burning ceiling fell on top of him. He escaped serious injury after William Haines quickly lifted the ceiling off of him.

References

External links

1925 films
American silent feature films
Silent American drama films
1925 drama films
Films directed by B. Reeves Eason
American black-and-white films
1920s American films